Toplița is a city in Harghita County, Romania.

Toplița may also refer to:

Populated places in Romania
 Toplița, Hunedoara, a commune in Hunedoara County
 Toplița, a village in Mălureni Commune, Argeș County
 Toplița, a village in Letca Commune, Sălaj County
 Toplița Mureșului and Măgura-Toplița, villages in Certeju de Sus Commune, Hunedoara County

Rivers in Romania
 Toplița, a tributary of the Barcău in Sălaj County
 Toplița, a tributary of the Bârsa in Brașov County
 Toplița, a tributary of the Comarnic in Caraș-Severin County
 Toplița, a tributary of the Fișag in Harghita County
 Toplița, a tributary of the Jiul de Vest in Hunedoara County
 Toplița, another name for the Topolița, a tributary of the Moldova in Neamț County
 Toplița (Mureș), a tributary of the Mureș in Harghita County
 Toplița, a tributary of the Sucevița in Suceava County
 Toplița, a tributary of the Măcicaș in Caraș-Severin County
 Toplița (Vâlsan), a tributary of the Vâlsan in Argeș County

See also
 Toeplitz (disambiguation)
 Toplica (disambiguation)
 Teplice (disambiguation)